Birnam is a suburb of Johannesburg, South Africa. It is located in Region E of the City of Johannesburg Metropolitan Municipality.

History
The suburb has its origin in 1905, of 14ha and 105 stands. Like most suburbs in the area, it is of Scottish origin, named for Birnam Woods.

References

Johannesburg Region E